Ekaterina Aleksandrovna Kramarenko (born April 22, 1991 in St Petersburg) is a Russian artistic gymnast. She is the 2007 European bronze medalist on the uneven bars and 2014 World bronze medalist in the team competition.

Senior career 
At the 2007 European Championships, Kramarenko placed 5th in the all-around final and won the bronze medal on the uneven bars.

2007 World Championships 
At the 2007 World Championships team final Kramarenko bailed on her vault and placed her hands on the vaulting table to stop her momentum. This automatically earned her a score of zero, dropping the Russian team from medal contention to last place. Kramarenko needed only a mediocre score to secure the bronze medal for Russia and theoretically could have sat down her vault and still won the medal. She was inconsolable after her vault and was comforted by her teammate Yulia Lozhechko as Elena Zamolodchikova completed her vault, knowing her score would not matter. This controversy reignited debate among the gymnastics community about the '3 up, 3 count' team final format and whether it ought to be abolished and the final reverted to a format where a score can be dropped.

When asked to comment on the incident, Russian coach Andrei Rodionenko explained, "Nobody knows what happened, it was a shock for everyone."

2008 Olympics 
Kramarenko was selected to represent Russia at the 2008 Summer Olympics. In the preliminary round she started off by sticking her double twisting Yurchenko, the vault she failed at during the last World Championships. She also rebounded on bars, scoring a 15.500. On beam, she had a fall on her front pike somersault, and only scored 14.625. She did a solid floor routine to earn 15.150 and a place in the floor exercise final. Even though she was 10th all around after the preliminary routine, she could not compete in the all around final due to the two per country rule. She went on to have solid performances in the team competition, bringing in 15.500 on bars and 15.125 on floor, contributing the highest score on the latter. However, multiple mistakes from her teammates, including two falls on beam and two large out of bounds deductions on floor, dropped Russia to 4th place, less than a point behind Romania. She placed fifth in the floor final with a score of 15.050.

2012–2013 
Kramarenko continued to compete after Beijing, and even after London. In October 2012, she won gold on uneven bars and placed fourth in the all-around at the Dityatin Cup. In the summer of 2013, she was named the alternate to the Russian team for the Universiade, but she won gold with her team at the Russian Cup in August. She also placed fifth in the all-around, fourth on uneven bars, and eighth on balance beam. She went on to compete at the Osijek World Cup, winning gold on bars and finishing fifth on floor.

In late October, she was named to the Russian team for the Élite Gym Massilia in November. In the Master Team division, the Russian team placed second in the all-around, bars, and beam, and fourth on vault and floor. Individually, she won silver on bars, bronze in the all-around, and placed fifth on beam. She qualified to the Top Massilia, where she placed sixth on beam and tied for gold on bars with France's Louise Vanhille. However, a tie breaker was induced, and the gold was awarded to Vanhille, giving Kramarenko the silver.

She was named to the Russian team for the Team Challenge at the Stuttgart World Cup, where they won the silver medal.

2014 
Kramarenko competed at the 2014 Russian Cup and won a silver medal with her team. She finished fourth in the uneven bars final with a score of 14.767, and she finished fifth in the all-around. She was put on the team that represented Russia at the 2014 World Championships along with Maria Kharenkova, Maria Paseka, Alla Sosnitskaya, Aliya Mustafina, and Daria Spiridonova. The team won bronze.

2015
Kramarenko competed at the Russian Championships in March 2015. She placed 4th with her team. Individually, she placed 6th in the all-around and won a silver on the uneven bars. She later withdrew from the floor exercise finals.

2016
Kramarenko's retirement, at age 24, was announced along with 2012 Olympian Anastasia Grishina and two-time World team member, Tatiana Nabieva, on January 19, 2016.

Competitive history

See also 
 List of Olympic female gymnasts for Russia

References

External links 
 
 
 Ekaterina Kramarenko on VK

1991 births
Living people
Russian female artistic gymnasts
Gymnasts at the 2008 Summer Olympics
Olympic gymnasts of Russia
Medalists at the World Artistic Gymnastics Championships
Universiade medalists in gymnastics
Universiade gold medalists for Russia
Medalists at the 2015 Summer Universiade
Gymnasts from Saint Petersburg
21st-century Russian women